Ezio "Eziolino" Capuano (born 19 January 1965) is an Italian football coach, currently in charge as head of  club Taranto.

Career

Coach 
Capuano is a head coach with massive experience as head coach in the lower ranks of Italian football, all from and below the third tier, and mostly in Southern Italy. He started his football activity as coach since the age of 20.

In September 2010 he was named new head coach of bottom-placed Belgian top flight club Eupen, with no points in the first five games under the guidance of Capuano's predecessor. In his debut in charge of the club, Capuano guided Eupen to a 0–0 away draw to Zulte Waregem, the first point in top flight history for the club. This was followed by a home loss at the hands of Germinal Beerschot and a sounding 4–0 defeat at Club Brugge's home. On 24 September Capuano announced his immediate resignation from the club, together with his whole coaching staff. On 1 November he was announced as new head coach of Lega Pro Prima Divisione side Paganese, a club he had already managed during the 2008–09 season.

He has been the head coach of Fondi, since 17 January 2012 h until 18 December 2012, when he resigned.

In July 2013 he was introduced as the new head coach of newly promoted Lega Pro Seconda Divisione club Casertana. His time at Casertana was however quite short-lived, as he was fired after only three games in charge.

Capuano returned into management in June 2014, as new head coach of Arezzo; the club, originally scheduled to play in the amateur Serie D league at the time of Capuano's appointment, was then admitted to Lega Pro to fill a vacancy. He guided the team to safety in its first season, with a squad mostly composed by loans and emergency signings, and was offered a two-year extension by the end of the season.

Capuano's second Arezzo season led him into the public spotlight due to a number of event, mostly originating from the exclusion of Nicolò Sperotto from the squad after he recorded Capuano's angry rant after a loss to an amateur team in a mid-week friendly game. Capuano himself was fired on 17 April 2016 after a winless streak of seven games and a falling out with the board, despite the team being in a safe league table position.

On 28 November 2016, Capuano returned into management as head coach of Lega Pro club Modena in place of Simone Pavan. Following a positive start to his coaching stint, with Modena finally out of the relegation play-off zone, he accepted a one-year contract extension in March 2017. On 6 November, Modena was officially excluded from the league and dissolved after failing to attended four consecutive matches due to financial irregularities; all staff were subsequently released.

On 10 November 2017, he was hired as the head coach of Serie C club Sambenedettese. He was dismissed from his coaching post on 29 April 2018, after a 0–1 home loss to AlbinoLeffe, with the team in second place in the league table with only one game to go.

He returned into management on 8 January 2019 as head coach of newly promoted Serie C club Rieti, successfully saving the team from relegation by achieving 24 points in his 17 games in charge. He left the club by mutual consent at the end of the season.

On 16 October 2019, he was hired by Serie C club Avellino. After leading the club to a spot in the promotion playoffs, then lost to Ternana, he was sacked on 7 July 2020.

On 2 September 2020 he was announced as the new head coach of Foggia, following the club's readmission to Serie C, a position he left just a few weeks later on 28 September. On 3 November 2020, he was announced as Mario Somma's replacement at the helm of Potenza, marking his return in charge of the club after ten years. He was sacked on 4 February 2021 following a string of negative results that left Potenza in the relegation playoff zone.

On 11 October 2021, Capuano took over as the new head coach of Serie C club ACR Messina, replacing Salvatore Sullo. He was however sacked only two months later, on 15 December, due to negative results.

On 12 September 2022, Capuano took on at Serie C club Taranto, replacing Nello Di Costanzo.

References

External links
Capuano's coaching career

1965 births
Living people
People from Salerno
Italian football managers
S.S. Juve Stabia managers
Modena F.C. managers
Potenza S.C. managers
A.C.R. Messina managers
Italian expatriate football managers
Expatriate football managers in Belgium
A.S. Sambenedettese managers
Serie C managers
Sportspeople from the Province of Salerno